St Angela's Ursuline School and Sixth Form is a Catholic secondary school for girls with a mixed gender 6th form centre. It is located in Forest Gate, East London, United Kingdom. It is a voluntary aided school which had 1375 students in 2014.

History 
St. Angela's is a Roman Catholic school started in February 1862 by four sisters of the Ursuline order from Belgium. 

The nuns bought a semi-detached house and bought the rest the following year. This property is known as "Old House" by the school. The nuns who soon became eight were inspired by the vision of their founder who became the school's namesake. In 1862 the school expanded to other buildings. The school had no uniform until 1877.

The school grew and in 1892 four nuns left this school to found another Ursuline school in Wimbledon.

In 1907 the school's first science lab was created.

Today 
St. Angela's is a multi-ethnic, voluntary-aided Language College in the London Borough of Newham. The school population reflects the Catholic population of the borough, which is largely Filipino, Afro-Caribbean, Indian, Sri Lankan, Latino, African and white. 95% of school population are from ethnic minorities. The school had an "outstanding" inspection by Ofsted in 2009.

St Angela's has won national championships in basketball and debating.

Notable former students
Margaret Tyzack - British actress (1931 – 2011)
Vanessa White - 1/5 of the girl group The Saturdays
Kele Le Roc - Double MOBO award-winning Singer
Amanda Newton - Former netball player

References

External links
 Official School Website

Secondary schools in the London Borough of Newham
Girls' schools in London
Educational institutions established in 1862
Catholic secondary schools in the Archdiocese of Westminster
Ursuline schools
1862 establishments in England
Voluntary aided schools in London
Forest Gate